{{Infobox military person
|name= Cassin Young
|birth_date= 
|death_date= 
|birth_place= Washington, D.C. 
|death_place= off Guadalcanal, Solomon Islands
|placeofburial=
|placeofburial_label= Place of burial
|image=Young, Cassin;h92310.jpg
|image_size=200
|caption= Captain Cassin Young, USN
|nickname=
|allegiance= United States of America
|branch=
|serviceyears= 1916 - 1942
|rank= Captain
|commands= Submarine Division SevenUSS Vestal[[USS San Francisco (CA-38)|USS San Francisco]]
|unit=
|battles=World War IWorld War II
 Attack on Pearl Harbor
 Naval Battle of Guadalcanal 
|awards=

|laterwork=
}}

Cassin Young (March 6, 1894 – November 13, 1942) was a captain in the United States Navy who received the Medal of Honor for his heroism during the attack on Pearl Harbor.

Biography
Young was born in Washington, D.C., on March 6, 1894. At the age of two he moved to Milwaukee, Wisconsin, where his father operated a drug store. After graduation from the U.S. Naval Academy on June 3, 1916, he served on the battleship  into 1919. He attended submarine school in 1919 and then spent several years in subs. In 1921, he and his family returned from Panama and he assisted in outfitting the USS S-51. In January 1922, he served in Naval Communications on the staff of Commander Submarine Divisions, Battle Fleet, and at the Naval Academy.

During 1931 to 1933, Lieutenant Commander Young served on the battleship . He was subsequently awarded command of the destroyer  and was assigned to the Eleventh Naval District from 1935 to 1937. After promotion to the rank of Commander, he commanded Submarine Division Seven and was stationed at Naval Submarine Base New London, in Groton, Connecticut.

When the Japanese attacked Pearl Harbor on December 7, 1941, he was commanding officer of the repair ship , which was badly damaged by Japanese bombs and the explosion of the battleship . Commander Young rapidly organized offensive action, personally taking charge of one of Vestals anti-aircraft guns. When Arizonas forward magazine exploded, the blast blew Young overboard. Although stunned, he was determined to save his ship by getting her away from the blazing Arizona. Swimming through burning oil back to Vestal, which was already damaged and about to be further damaged, Young got her underway and beached her, thus ensuring her later salvage. His heroism was recognized with the Medal of Honor.

Promoted to Captain in February 1942, he took command of the heavy cruiser  on November 9, 1942.  On November 13, 1942, during the Naval Battle of Guadalcanal, he guided his ship in action with a superior Japanese force and was killed by enemy shells while closely engaging the battleship Hiei. Captain Young was posthumously awarded the Navy Cross for his actions during the campaign and San Francisco received the Presidential Unit Citation.

Military decorations
Young's decorations and awards include:

Medal of Honor citation
Medal of Honor citation:

For distinguished conduct in action, outstanding heroism and utter disregard of his own safety, above and beyond the call of duty, as Commanding Officer of the U.S.S. Vestal, during the attack on the Fleet in Pearl Harbor, Territory of Hawaii, by enemy Japanese forces on December 7, 1941. Commander Young proceeded to the bridge and later took personal command of the 3-inch antiaircraft gun. When blown overboard by the blast of the forward magazine explosion of the U.S.S. Arizona, to which the U.S.S. Vestal was moored, he swam back to his ship. The entire forward part of the U.S.S. Arizona was a blazing inferno with oil afire on the water between the two ships; as a result of several bomb hits, the U.S.S. Vestal was afire in several places, was settling and taking on a list. Despite severe enemy bombing and strafing at the time, and his shocking experience of having been blown overboard, Commander Young, with extreme coolness and calmness, moved his ship to an anchorage distant from the U.S.S. Arizona, and subsequently beached the U.S.S. Vestal upon determining that such action was required to save his ship.

PRESENTATION DATE & DETAILS: APRIL 18, 1942
PEARL HARBOR, TERRITORY OF HAWAII, ONBOARD THE U.S.S. VESTAL, PRESENTED BY ADM. CHESTER W. NIMITZ

Captain Young's Medal of Honor is on display at the Naval Academy Museum in Annapolis MD.

Navy Cross citation
Navy Cross citation:

For extraordinary heroism and distinguished service in the line of his profession as Commanding Officer of the Heavy Cruiser U.S.S. San Francisco, during an engagement with Japanese naval forces near Savo Island on the night of 12 - 13 November, 1942. On this occasion the force to which Captain Young was attached engaged at close quarters and defeated a superior enemy force, inflicting heavy damage upon them and preventing the accomplishment of their intended mission. This daring and intrepid attack, brilliantly executed, led to a great victory for his country's forces. By his indomitable fighting spirit, expert seamanship, and gallant devotion to duty, Captain Young contributed largely to the success of the battle and upheld the highest traditions of the United States Naval Service. He gallantly gave his life for his country.

Namesake
In 1943, the destroyer  was named in his honor.  This famous destroyer has been restored and is now berthed at the Charlestown Navy Yard in Boston Harbor, across from the USS Constitution.

See also

 List of Medal of Honor recipients

References

 
 

Further reading
 "World War II Milwaukee,"''  Meg Jones. The History Press, 2015

1894 births
1942 deaths
Attack on Pearl Harbor
Recipients of the Navy Cross (United States)
United States Navy Medal of Honor recipients
United States Navy captains
United States Naval Academy alumni
United States submarine commanders
Military personnel from Washington, D.C.
United States Navy personnel killed in World War II
World War II recipients of the Medal of Honor
People who died at sea
Military personnel from Wisconsin